Lucie Heroldová is a Czech former football defender who played for most of her career for Sparta Prague in the Czech 1st Division and the Champions League.

She has been a member of the Czech national team. She made her debut for the national team on 27 May 2000 in a match against Ireland.

References

1981 births
Living people
Czech women's footballers
Czech Republic women's international footballers
Sportspeople from Písek
Women's association football defenders
SK Slavia Praha (women) players
AC Sparta Praha (women) players
Czech Women's First League players